Greenfield, Ontario can mean the following places:
Greenfield, Leeds and Grenville United Counties, Ontario
Greenfield, Prescott and Russell United Counties, Ontario
Greenfield, Waterloo Regional Municipality, Ontario
Greenfield, Stormont, Dundas and Glengarry United Counties, Ontario